Dominick Bragalone (born November 17, 1996) is an American football running back formerly for the Montreal Alouettes of the Canadian Football League (CFL). He played college football for Lehigh.

Bragalone attended high school in South Williamsport, Pennsylvania where in his senior season set Pennsylvania's all-time record for single season rushing yards with 4,704 yards. He sits second on the single season rushing total nationally, winning the 2014 Mr. Pennsylvania Football award.  Bragalone's collegiate career ended in 2019 as he graduated from Lehigh University with a bachelor's degree in psychology.

High school
Bragalone attended South Williamsport Area High School in South Williamsport, Pennsylvania. He played football and ran track where he excelled in both. He was a 2014 MaxPreps small school All-American, honorable mention Parade Magazine All-American and two-time Pennsylvania Class A Player of the Year. two-time Pennsylvania Class A All-State. He set state single season rushing record for the state of Pennsylvania with 4704 yards and second-highest single-season rushing total in the nation.

Awards
 2× Pennsylvania Class A Player of the Year
 2× PA Class A All-State
 Parade Magazine All American
 Sun Gazette All Area Team
 PA Football All-State
 MaxPreps All-American 
 PrepFBall All-American
 Mr. Pennsylvania Football

Records
 Single season Pennsylvania rushing record (As of end of 2017 season)
 Highest rushing total in Pennsylvania history (As of end of 2017 season)
 Second highest rushing total in nation (As of end of 2017 season)

College career
Bragalone chose Lehigh over walk-on spots at Penn State and Rutgers. In his first season Bragalone rushed for over 1,000 yards the first Lehigh freshman to do so in over 10 years. Upon Bragalone's stellar freshman season he was named Patriot League Rookie of the Year. Coming into his sophomore season Bragalone was named on numerous national award watchlists.  In 2016 Bragalone rushed for over 1,100 yards and 14 touchdowns. In his junior year he rushed for 1,388 yards, 18 touchdowns and 200 yards relieving, including a 218-yard, 2 touchdown performance against Fordham.

Statistics

Awards
 Patriot League Offensive Player of the Year (2017)
 First team Associated Press All-American
 First team AFCA All-American
 First team Walter Camp All-American
 First team STATS All-American
 3x First team All-Patriot League (2015, 2016, 2017)
 ECAC Offensive Rookie of the Year (2015)
 Patriot League Rookie of the Year (2015)
 FCS Rushing Leader (2017)

Professional career
Bragalone was invited to both the New York Giants' and Houston Texans' rookie mini-camps, but did not sign a contract with either team. He signed with the Montreal Alouettes on February 26, 2020.  His number was 35 prior to his release.

References

1996 births
Living people
American football running backs
Lehigh Mountain Hawks football players
Sportspeople from Williamsport, Pennsylvania
Players of American football from Pennsylvania
Montreal Alouettes players